Reply 1994 is a 2013 South Korean television series starring Go Ara, Jung Woo, Yoo Yeon-seok, Kim Sung-kyun, Son Ho-jun, Baro, Min Do-hee, Sung Dong-il, and Lee Il-hwa. It aired on tvN from October 18 to December 28, 2013 for 21 episodes.

Written by Lee Woo-jung and directed by Shin Won-ho, 1994 is the second installment of the Reply series. Its final episode garnered an average viewership rating of 11.509%, making it one of the highest-rated Korean dramas in cable television history.

Synopsis
Set in 1994, six university students from various provincial areas of South Korea (Jeolla Province, Chungcheong Province and Gyeongsang Province) live together at a boarding house in Sinchon, Seoul, which is run by a couple with a daughter named Sung Na-jung.

Like its predecessor,Reply 1997,the series follows a nonlinear story telling where it shifts between the past in 1994 and the present in 2013, making the viewers guess who will become Na-jung's husband among the male characters.

The series follows the historically and culturally significant events that happened in the country in 1994 and the years that followed, including the emergence of seminal K-pop group Seo Taiji and Boys, the Sampoong Department Store collapse and the birth of the Korean Basketball League. The names of the boys are revealed later, to avoid spoilers. They're mostly just referred to by their nicknames listed below.

Cast

Main 

 Go Ara as Sung Na-jung
 Originally from Masan, South Gyeongsang Province, she is majoring in Computer Engineering, has an easygoing personality and is a big fan of basketball player Lee Sang-min.

 Jung Woo as "Sseureki" (meaning "Garbage" or "Trash") 
 A medical student. He was the best friend of Na-jung's late older brother, and grew up with the Sung siblings. (Hometown: Masan, South Gyeongsang Province)

 Yoo Yeon-seok as "Chilbong" (meaning "Seven Shut-outs)
 Although he is only a freshman, he is the number one pitcher of Yonsei University's baseball team. He has a crush on Na-jung. (Hometown: Gangnam, Seoul)

 Kim Sung-kyun as "Samcheonpo" (referencing his hometown) 
 He looks much older than he actually is. (Hometown: Samcheonpo, South Gyeongsang Province)

 Son Ho-jun as "Haitai" (referencing baseball team Haitai Tigers) 
 His father is the CEO of the bus company Suncheon Transportation Inc. (Hometown: Suncheon, South Jeolla Province)

 Baro as "Binggeure" (meaning "Smiley"; referencing baseball team Binggrae Eagles) 
 Chilbong's cousin, and Garbage's junior in school. (Hometown: Goesan, North Chungcheong Province)

 Min Do-hee as Jo Yoon-jin 
 A fan of Seo Taiji and Boys, and a quiet, aggressive student. (Hometown: Yeosu, South Jeolla Province)

 Sung Dong-il as Sung Dong-il
 A coach of the baseball team Seoul Ssangdungi, and Na-jung's father.

 Lee Il-hwa as Lee Il-hwa
 She runs a boarding house in Seoul along with her husband Dong-il and daughter Na-jung.

Supporting 
 Yook Sung-jae as Sung Joon ("Ssuk-ssuk")
 Sung Joon (Sung Dong-il's son) as young Sung Joon
 Shin Soo-yeon as young Sung Na-jung
 Yoon Jong-hoon as Kim Ki-tae
 Yeon Joon-seok as Kim Dong-woo
 Lee Bong-ryun as Na-jung's classmate

Special appearances

 Moon Kyung-eun as himself (ep 1)
 Woo Ji-won as himself (ep 1)
 Kim Hoon as himself (ep 1)
 Hong Seok-cheon as ROTC cadet (ep 2)
 Na Yeong-seok as Yonsei student boarder (ep 2) 
 Huh Kyung-young as interrogatory student boarder (ep 2)
 Bae Woo-hee as Ha Hee-ra
 Kim Min-young as Lee Soon-ja (ep 2)
 Kim Kwang-kyu as Na Chang-seok, Sseureki's professor at the university hospital (ep 5)
 Kim Jong-min as doctor (ep 5)
 Lee Joo-yeon as medical student Lee Joo-won (ep 5)
 Kim Jung-min as himself (ep 5)
 NC.A as Ssuk-ssuk's girlfriend in 2013 (ep 6)
 Park Gyeong-ree as one of Na-jung's friends on the group date (ep 7)
 Park Min-ha as one of Na-jung's friends on the group date (ep 7)
 Lee Hye-min as one of Na-jung's friends on the group date (ep 7)
 Lee Yoo-joon as one of Sseureki's friends on the group date (ep 7)
 Ji Seung-hyun as one of Sseureki's friends on the group date (ep 7)
 Yang Ki-won as one of Sseureki's friends on the group date (ep 7)
 Lee Kyung-shil as Dong-il's first love (ep 8)
 Jung Sung-ho as songwriter (ep 9)
 Lee Jung-eun as Samcheonpo's mother (ep 10)
 Choi Deok-moon as Kim Yoon-shik, Samcheonpo's father (ep 10)
 Jo Yang-ja as Samcheonpo's grandmother (ep 10)
 Kim Han-jong as Samcheonpo's drunk neighbor (ep 10)
 Kim In-seo as Haitai's crush (ep 11)
 Kim Byung-choon as Jung Man-ho, Dong-il's friend (ep 12)
 Jo Jae-yoon as Kim Jae-young (ep 12)
 Kim Won-hae as Sseureki's father (ep 12, 21)
 Seo Yoo-ri as Joo-kyung, Sseureki's first love (ep 12)
 Kim Min-jong as himself (ep 13)
 Choi Jong-hoon as sergeant (ep 14)
 Kim Seul-gi as Sseureki's cousin (ep 14-15)
 Song Min-ji as Min-jung, Sseureki's coworker (ep 16–17, 20)
 Yoon Jin-yi as Jin-yi/"Die Die" (ep 16-17)
 Jung Eun-ji as Sung Shi-won (ep 16–17, 21)
 Seo In-guk as Yoon Yoon-jae (ep 16–17, 21)
 Hoya as Kang Joon-hee (ep 16)
 Lee Si-eon as Bang Sung-jae (ep 16)
 Shin So-yul as Mo Yoo-jung (ep 16)
 Eun Ji-won as Do Hak-chan (ep 17)
 Kim Jae-kyung as "Yonsei's Jun Ji-hyun" (ep 18)
 Go Woo-ri as "Yonsei's Uhm Jung-hwa" (ep 18)
 Jun Hyun-moo as Haitai's junior (ep 18)
 Yoon Min-soo as married man (ep 18)
 Jo Yun-seo as Ae-jung (ep 18-19)
 Jung Yu-mi as girl who bumps into Chilbong (ep 21)

Production
Director Shin Won-ho and writer Lee Woo-jung had originally planned for their previous TV series to be set in 1994, which was the year they entered college (Shin studied chemical engineering at Seoul National University). But they decided to change the year to 1997 after casting Sechs Kies member Eun Ji-won, since H.O.T. and Sechs Kies fandom was at its peak that year, which made an interesting juxtaposition to the failing Korean economy during the IMF crisis.

Shin and Lee felt there was enough material for another series, and in a bid to replicate Reply 1997'''s success, cable channel tvN announced a "sequel" or "second season" in April 2013. Shin said, "The stories about people moving to Seoul are full of unpredictable incidents."

Despite the same writer and director, and the casting of Sung Dong-il and Lee Il-hwa, Reply 1994 is not a prequel of Reply 1997''; it uses the same concept of coming-of-age drama combined with 1990s nostalgia, but with a completely new plot and characters.

A novelization was published on January 17, 2014.

Original soundtrack
Soundtracks for the drama consist of re-arranged popular Korean songs from the nineties. All re-arranged songs are well received by Korean general public and topped various Korean music charts.

Part 1

Part 2

Part 3

Part 4

Part 5

Part 6

Part 7

Part 8

Reply 1994 Director's Cut OST

Ratings
In this table,  represent the lowest ratings and  represent the highest ratings.

Awards and nominations

Notes

References

External links 
  
 
 

Korean-language television shows
2013 South Korean television series debuts
2013 South Korean television series endings
2010s college television series
2010s teen drama television series
TVN (South Korean TV channel) television dramas
Television series set in 1994
South Korean LGBT-related television shows
Television shows set in Seoul
Television series by CJ E&M
South Korean comedy-drama television series